Serna is a surname. Notable people with the name include:

 Alexis Serna (born 1985), American player of gridiron football
 Andrea Serna (born 1977), Colombian model, TV presenter, reporter, and producer 
 Assumpta Serna (born 1957), Spanish actress
 Darkin Serna (born 1993), Colombian footballer
 Diego Serna (born 1973), Colombian footballer
 Dillon Serna (born 1994), American soccer player
 Elkin Serna, Colombian Paralympic marathon runner
 Enrique Serna, (born 1959), Mexican author and screenwriter
 Frankie Serna, (born 1971), American artist, illustrator and designer
 Isaac Serna (born 1955), Peruvian politician
 Joe Serna, Jr. (1939–1999), American civil rights activist and mayor of Sacramento
 Jorge Horacio Serna (born 1979), Colombian footballer
 Léa Serna (born 1999), French figure skater
 Lily Serna (born 1986), Australian mathematician and television presenter
 Magüi Serna (born 1979), Spanish tennis player
 Marcelino Serna (1896–1992), Mexican immigrant and United States Army soldier
 Marco Antonio Serna Díaz (1936–1991), Colombian herpetologist, ornithologist, and naturalist
 Mauricio Serna (born 1968), Colombian footballer
 Patricio M. Serna, New Mexican Supreme Court Justice
 Paul Serna (born 1958), American baseball player
 Pepe Serna (born 1944), American film and television actor and artist
 Ralph Serna (born 1957), American long-distance runner
 Ricardo Serna (born 1964), Spanish footballer
 Snooky Serna (born 1966), Filipina film and television actress
 Sara Serna (born 1987), Spanish footballer
 Viviana Serna (born 1990), Colombian actress and presenter
 Victor Juan Serna (1925-1998), American WW2 Navy Veteran-Purple Heart and L.A. County Sheriff

See also
Sernas
La Serna (disambiguation)
de la Serna